Rat Race is a 2001 American comedy film directed by Jerry Zucker. Inspired by Stanley Kramer's 1963 film It's a Mad, Mad, Mad, Mad World, the film features an ensemble cast consisting of Rowan Atkinson, Whoopi Goldberg, Cuba Gooding Jr., Wayne Knight, Jon Lovitz, Kathy Najimy, Lanei Chapman, Breckin Meyer, Amy Smart, Seth Green, Vince Vieluf, John Cleese and Dave Thomas.

The film centers on six teams of people who are given the task of racing  from a Las Vegas casino to a Silver City, New Mexico train station where a storage locker contains a duffel bag filled with $2 million. Each team is given a key to the locker and the first person to reach the locker gets the money.

Produced by Fireworks Pictures, Alphaville Films and Zucker's Zucker Productions, the film was released theatrically by Paramount Pictures on August 17, 2001, in the United States and Canada. Despite receiving mixed to negative reviews from critics, the film was a box office success, having grossed $85.5 million worldwide against a $48 million budget, and in recent years has developed a cult following.

Plot

Eccentric tycoon Donald Sinclair devises a game to entertain the high rollers who visit his Las Vegas casino. Sinclair's guests place bets on who will win.

The racers consist of dimwitted con-artist brothers Duane and Blaine Cody, uptight businesswoman Merrill Jennings and her overly optimistic mother Vera, disgraced football referee Owen Templeton, gambling addict Randy Pear and his family, narcoleptic Italian tourist Enrico Pollini, and no-nonsense attorney Nick Schaffer. Having initially agreed not to play, greed takes over and they start to race.

Duane and Blaine destroy the airport radar, grounding everybody else but wrecking their vehicle so they steal another. They split up to better their chances. They have a locksmith create a duplicate locker key but he overhears their plan and makes off with the key in a hot air balloon. The brothers catch him and leave him and a stray cow hanging from the balloon's anchor rope. Their car is crushed by a monster truck which they then steal.

Merrill and Vera are given malicious directions and crash. They steal a rocket car until it runs out of fuel, then stumble onto a busload of mental patients headed for Silver City.

Owen is kicked out of a taxi and pantsed for his bad call at a football game that caused the driver to lose his bet. He impersonates the driver of a busload of Lucille Ball cosplayers. He hits the cow dangling from the balloon and crashes. He reveals that he is not the real driver and the enraged women chase him. He escapes and steals a horse to ride to Silver City.

Randy and his family, at the insistence of their daughter, visit a museum to Nazi Klaus Barbie, believing it to be about Barbie the doll. They steal Adolf Hitler's staff car after Duane and Blaine sabotage their vehicle. When his family insist they end the trip, Randy drugs them with sleeping pills and bundles them into a semi-truck.

Nick chooses not to participate but changes his mind when he meets Tracy Faucet, who gives him a lift in her helicopter. She uses it to attack her cheating boyfriend, then having damaged the helicopter she and Nick steal the boyfriend's truck and form a romantic relationship while driving to Silver City.

Enrico is more excited by the race than the money but falls asleep at the start, only waking hours later. He gets a ride from Zack, an ambulance driver delivering a transplant heart. Enrico inadvertently drops the heart out of the window, whereupon it is stolen by a dog, which is then electrocuted on an electric fence. Zack decides to kill Enrico to replace the missing heart. Enrico escapes by boarding a passing train where he drops his key in a baby's diaper and, retrieving it, is mistaken for a pedophile. He is thrown out at Silver City station and is the first to reach the locker, only to fall asleep upon unlocking it.

The racers reunite in Silver City and fight to open the locker only to find it empty. Outside, Sinclair's assistant Grisham and call girl Vicki are making off with the money. The locksmith maneuvers the balloon to drop the cow on Grisham and ties the money bag to the balloon. The racers chase the balloon to a Smash Mouth charity concert. The band and crowd mistake the money for a donation. Once the racers see the charitable good spirit engendered, they are persuaded to donate. Nick horrifies Sinclair and his patrons by announcing that Sinclair and the gamblers will match the money raised. Sinclair is distraught as the donations total shoots past $19 million while the racers dance to "All Star".

Cast
Main

 John Cleese as Donald P. Sinclair, an eccentric Las Vegas billionaire and gambling mastermind. (Donald Sinclair was the name of the former joint owner of the Gleneagles Hotel, Torquay and provided the inspiration for the eccentric Basil Fawlty (John Cleese), joint owner of the fictional Torquay hotel Fawlty Towers). 
 Breckin Meyer as Nicholas "Nick" Schaffer, a strait-laced young attorney
 Amy Smart as Tracy Faucet, an experienced helicopter pilot with rage issues and Nick's love interest 
 Cuba Gooding Jr. as Owen Templeton, a disgraced football referee, recently infamous for a bad call
 Seth Green as Duane Cody, a ne'er do well looking to make money off insurance scams
 Vince Vieluf as Blaine Cody, Duane's unintelligible body-piercing brother
 Lanei Chapman as Merrill Jennings, a high-strung businesswoman with some rage issues
 Whoopi Goldberg as Vera Baker, Merrill's superstitious mother, who gave Merrill up for adoption and is now reuniting with her
 Jon Lovitz as Randy Pear, a sneaky, irresponsible and recklessly opportunist tourist 
 Kathy Najimy as Beverly "Bev" Pear, Randy's wife
 Brody Smith as Jason Pear, Randy and Bev's older child
 Jillian Marie Hubert as Kimberly Pear, Randy and Bev's younger child
 Rowan Atkinson as Enrico Pollini, a simple-minded, narcoleptic Italian tourist from Naples, Italy
 Dave Thomas as Harold Grisham, Sinclair's attorney
 Wayne Knight as Zack Mallozzi, a medical supply driver
 Silas Weir Mitchell as Lloyd, a locksmith
 Brandy Ledford as Vicki, a call girl

Minor

 Paul Rodriguez as Gus, a taxi driver 
 Dean Cain as Shawn Kent, Tracy's ex-boyfriend
 Colleen Camp as Rainbow House Nurse
 Deborah Theaker as one of the Lucille Ball cosplayers
 Charlotte Zucker as an elderly Lucille Ball cosplayer
 Rance Howard as Feed the Earth Spokesman
 Gloria Allred as herself
 Smash Mouth as themselves
 Kathy Bates (uncredited) as a roadside squirrel seller
 Diamond Dallas and Kimberly Page (deleted scenes) as themselves
 Manoj Sood as a Saudi high roller
 Tristin Leffler as a pierced girl
 Lucy Lee Flippin as Feed the Earth spokesperson 

Fox Sports commentators

 Chris Myers as himself
 Kevin Frazier as himself

Production

Development
Rat Race was initially written by Darryl Quarles as a spec script. By February 1999, the script had been sold to Hollywood Pictures and producer Jerry Bruckheimer. In August 1999, Jerry Zucker was in negotiations to direct the film for Paramount Pictures from a screenplay written by Andy Breckman that would be set in Las Vegas, Nevada and in New Mexico.

Paramount hoped to begin production of the film in the end of 1999 or the beginning of 2000. Jerry and Janet Zucker were to produce the film alongside Sean Daniel, while Daniel's partner in Alphaville Films, James Jacks, would serve as executive producer. The filmmakers initially considered having the film's characters race from Las Vegas, Nevada to Las Vegas, New Mexico, but the idea was rejected following concerns that it might confuse viewers.

In January 2000, Las Vegas, Nevada was confirmed as a filming location for Rat Race. Location scouting in southern Nevada was scheduled for May 2000, while filming in the area was delayed until the fall of 2000, to avoid shooting the film in one hundred degree summer heat. Breckin Meyer and Amy Smart were cast in the film in June 2000, while Dean Cain also joined the cast in October.

Actor John Cleese praised the script as one of only two scripts during his career that he enjoyed: "It's so unusual to get a top class script. Twice in my life I've had the experience of reading a script and simply saying, 'I'm going to do this.'"

Filming
Filming began in Calgary, Alberta, Canada in August 2000. Filming took place primarily along Calgary's highways, which stood in as highways that the characters travel on in Nevada, Arizona and New Mexico. Desert scenes were shot in the Canadian town of Drumheller. Second unit filming began in Las Vegas on August 7, 2000, with scenes primarily involving Cuba Gooding Jr.

Scheduled filming locations included the Las Vegas Strip, Tropicana Avenue (east of the Las Vegas Strip), McCarran International Airport, and Nevada State Route 159. Other scheduled filming locations in Nevada included Goodsprings and Sandy Valley.

Scenes involving Gooding and the group of Lucy impersonators were shot in the Canadian Rockies. Jerry Zucker, who had a tradition of including his mother Charlotte in each of his films beginning with Airplane!, had her portray one of the Lucy impersonators. Jerry Zucker said, "It's like the Alfred Hitchcock signature. Instead of me, it's mom." Filming also took place at Calgary's former Currie Barracks military base, which had been converted to accommodate film and television productions.

Sound stages were constructed inside two aircraft hangars at the base to be used for many of the film's interior scenes, including the Venetian's hotel rooms and conference room. Driving scenes, using green screens and rear projection effects, were also shot inside the hangars. The scene with the coin toss by Owen Templeton was filmed at Calgary's McMahon Stadium during a game on September 4.

Filming returned to Las Vegas for a nine-day period beginning on September 20, 2000, with the first three days spent at the McCarran International Airport, before moving to the Venetian resort on the Las Vegas Strip for a six-day shoot. Venetian officials negotiated with Paramount for six months to use the resort in the film. Scenes were shot throughout the Venetian, with the exception of its hotel rooms. Venetian scenes included the casino, lobby, and the entrance to its valet parking garage, as well as exterior shots of the resort. Approximately 1,000 background extras were needed during the second Las Vegas shoot. On September 25, 2000, second unit filming took place along Nevada State Route 161, leading to Goodsprings.

Filming in Las Vegas concluded on September 29, 2000, and production moved to Ely, Nevada, which stood in as Silver City, New Mexico. Ely's Nevada Northern Railway Museum stood in as the Silver City train station. According to the Nevada Film Office, the filmmakers "fell in love" with the museum after being shown pictures of it. As a result, the initial two day shoot in Ely was extended to six days. Ely's western entrance, accessed from U.S. Route 50, was used as the entrance to Silver City.

After concluding in Ely, production crews relocated to southern California for the final six weeks of filming, mainly for exterior scenes. California filming primarily occurred in Antelope Valley, Palmdale, Acton, Santa Clarita, and Newhall. Rosamond, California was also a primary location, with filming occurring during a three-week period in October 2000. Smart's helicopter scenes were filmed at 3118 Carnation Street in Rosamond. Additional filming in California occurred at Big Sky Ranch and El Mirage Lake.

Sinclair and the gamblers' eccentric habits are further exaggerated in deleted scenes, where they partake in many more ridiculous bets, including playing Monopoly with real money. In another scene, a high roller pretends to find what they are doing immoral. Professional wrestler Diamond Dallas Page and his wife, Kimberly, had a cameo that was cut when test audiences failed to give his appearance any reaction. The scene is available on the DVD release.

Reception

Box office
Rat Race was released in both the United States and Canada on August 17, 2001, and grossed US$11,662,094 in its opening weekend at the North American box office, ranking third behind American Pie 2 and Rush Hour 2. The film ultimately grossed $56.6 million domestically and $28.8 million overseas for a worldwide total of approximately $85.5 million based on a budget of an estimated $48 million, making it commercially successful.

The film was released in the United Kingdom on January 11, 2002, and opened also at number three behind the non-comedic The Lord of the Rings: The Fellowship of the Ring and Harry Potter and the Philosopher's Stone. For the next two weekends, the film regained the spot, before moving down one place and then four places down before finally ending up on No. 10 on February 10, 2002.

Critical response
On review aggregator Rotten Tomatoes, the film holds an approval rating of 45% based on 128 reviews, with an average rating of 5.00/10. The website's critical consensus reads, "Rat Race moves from one sight gag to another, but only a handful of them are genuinely funny." On Metacritic, the film received a score of 52 based on 26 reviews, indicating "mixed or average reviews". Audiences polled by CinemaScore gave the film an above average grade of "B+" on an A+ to F scale.

See also
 Around the World in 80 Days
 It's a Mad, Mad, Mad, Mad World
 The Great Race
 Scavenger Hunt
 Midnight Madness
 The Cannonball Run
 Million Dollar Mystery
 The Amazing Race
 Dhamaal

References

External links

 
 
 
 
 
 

2001 films
2000s English-language films
2001 comedy films
2000s chase films
2000s comedy road movies
2000s screwball comedy films
American chase films
American comedy road movies
American screwball comedy films
American slapstick comedy films
Films directed by Jerry Zucker
Films with screenplays by Andy Breckman
Films scored by John Powell
Films about competitions
Films about Nazis
Films set in the Las Vegas Valley
Films set in New Mexico
Films set in hotels
Films set in airports
Films set in deserts
Films shot in Los Angeles
Films shot in the Las Vegas Valley
Films shot in Calgary
Fireworks Entertainment films
Paramount Pictures films
Treasure hunt films
Films about gambling
2000s American films
English-language comedy films